Villecomtal (；) is a commune in the Aveyron department in southern France. It was founded circa 1295 by Henri II, count of Rodez.

Population

See also
Communes of the Aveyron department

References

Communes of Aveyron
Aveyron communes articles needing translation from French Wikipedia